Corinne Niogret (born 20 November 1972, in Nantua, Ain) is a former French biathlete. She won 2 Olympic medals and 15 medals in the Biathlon World Championships. In 1999/2000 she finished 3rd in the overall World Cup, and she has a total of 8 victories in World Cup races.

References
 
 

1972 births
Living people
People from Nantua
French female biathletes
Olympic biathletes of France
Olympic gold medalists for France
Olympic bronze medalists for France
Biathletes at the 1992 Winter Olympics
Biathletes at the 1994 Winter Olympics
Biathletes at the 1998 Winter Olympics
Olympic medalists in biathlon
Biathlon World Championships medalists
Medalists at the 1992 Winter Olympics
Medalists at the 1994 Winter Olympics
Université Savoie-Mont Blanc alumni
Sportspeople from Ain
20th-century French women